Joseph Levy may refer to:

 Joseph Moses Levy (1812–1888), newspaper editor and publisher
 Joseph Hiam Levy (1838–1913), English author and economist
 Joseph (Yoske) Levy (born 1927), Israeli artist
 Joseph Halévy (1827–1917), French Orientalist and traveller